Trevor Converse (born February 4, 1970) is a Canadian retired professional ice hockey player who spent ten seasons in the minor leagues. Converse played 312 games with fifteen different teams from 1991 until 2000, where he finished his career with the Wichita Thunder. He also attended Edmonton Oilers training camp as a free agent in 1991.

After his retirement in 2000, Converse was named the Assistant Coach of the Topeka Roadrunners. Converse is currently the Director Of Player Personnel for the El Paso Rhinos, a Junior "A" Tier III team based in El Paso, Texas.

Awards and accomplishments
1991-92: Colonial Cup winner (Thunder Bay Thunder Hawks)

References

External links

1970 births
Baltimore Bandits players
Canadian ice hockey right wingers
Colorado Gold Kings players
Fort Worth Brahmas players
Fort Worth Fire players
Fresno Falcons players
Hershey Bears players
Ice hockey people from Saskatchewan
Johnstown Chiefs players
Living people
Mobile Mysticks players
Phoenix Mustangs players
Richmond Renegades players
San Antonio Iguanas players
San Diego Gulls (WCHL) players
Thunder Bay Thunder Hawks players
Wichita Thunder players
Canadian expatriate ice hockey players in the United States